In beekeeping, a queen excluder is a selective barrier inside the beehive that allows worker bees but not the larger queens and drones to traverse the barrier. Queen excluders are also used with some queen breeding methods. Some beekeepers believe that excluders lead to less efficient hives as often worker bees, not used to travelling through the excluder, are intimidated and stay in the lower brood box. This can lead to rapid filling of the brood box and overcrowding resulting eventually in the hive swarming.

Purpose 

The intent of the queen excluder is to limit the queen's access to the honey supers. If the queen lays eggs in the honey supers and a brood develops in them it is difficult to harvest clean honey. It makes fall management more difficult. Queen excluders are removed in the autumn; otherwise, the queen would not be able to move with the winter cluster and would die from exposure. A replacement queen can be difficult to introduce because the bees will not be accustomed to the new queen's pheromones. New queens can be killed by the hive. Therefore, the death of a queen in winter is dangerous for a hive and can be expensive for a beekeeper.

Queen excluders are used with some queen breeding methods, especially as a way to allow queen cells to be built in the same hive with an existing queen, or as a way to house multiple queens in the same hive.

Design 

Queen excluders can also be constructed of hardware cloth screen, of which #5 hardware cloth is often cited in references as sufficient for allowing worker bees to pass, but not queens.

References 

Beekeeping tools
Ukrainian inventions